Laurence Edmund Parsons was an eminent Anglican clergyman in the 20th century.He was born on 22 July 1883 and educated at Winchester, Christ Church and Cuddesdon. Ordained in 1908, he  initially held curacies at St Bartholomew’s, Leeds. then Chaplain to the Bishop of Southwark before becoming a missionary in Shantung. Later he was Vicar of Chippenham then Dean of Cape Town. After this he was  Director  of the South African Church Institute then General Secretary of the SPCK until his retirement in 1954. He died on 17 December 1972

Notes

1883 births
People educated at Winchester College
Alumni of Christ Church, Oxford
Alumni of Ripon College Cuddesdon
Deans of Cape Town
1972 deaths